Gastropholis is a genus of Equatorial African lacertid lizards of the family Lacertidae which is distributed in southern Liberia, Ivory Coast and Ghana, western Cameroon, Equatorial Guinea, Democratic Republic of Congo, eastern Kenya, Tanzania and south to northeastern Mozambique.

Etymology
Gastropholis is derived from the ancient Greek words "gaster" ( γαστήρ) which means "belly, stomach" and, "pholis" ( φολῐ́ς), a "horny scale of a reptile". The common name of these lizards is Keel-bellied Lizards.

Habitat and natural history
Not much is known but all species of this genus are diurnal, arboreal and often secretive. They inhabit forests, woodland and thicket of coastal plains from sea level to 2000 m altitude. Usually they live high up in the trees 10 m or more above ground level and hide in holes or under loose bark. For sun-basking and feeding (insects and other arthropods, also smaller lizards) they move on branches using their prehensile tails as balancing organs.

Eggs are laid in moist tree holes. Gastropholis prasina is known to produce clutches of five-ten eggs. At 26-29 °C incubation temperature the eggs hatched after 61 days.

Diagnosis
Gastropholis shares with the other genera of Equatorial African lacertids (EAL; Adolfus, Congolacerta, Holaspis) the consistently absent parietal foramen, the parietal scale extending to the edge of the parietal table and a single postnasal scale.

The species of Gastropholis are characterized by a high ventral scale count (10-14 rows, other EAL only 6 rows transversely), keeled ventrals (smooth in all other EAL), and a long prehensile tail. Gastropholis species are the largest of the EAL clade with adult snout-vent lengths of 80–110 mm.
They are well adapted for climbing with their long limbs, hooked claws and long tails. For a key to the species of Gastropholis see Arnold (1989).

Species
Four species are recognized:
Gastropholis echinata (Cope, 1862)
Gastropholis prasina (Werner, 1904) - green keel-bellied lizard
Gastropholis tropidopholis (Boulenger, 1916)
Gastropholis vittata (Fischer, 1886) - keelbelly ground lizard

References

Further reading
Arnold, E.N. (1989): "Systematics and adaptive radiation of Equatorial African lizards assigned to the genera Adolfus, Bedriagaia, Gastropholis, Holaspis and Lacerta (Reptilia: Lacertidae)". Journal of Natural History 23: 525-555.
Ashe, J. & Ashe, S. (1999): "Some notes on Gastropholis prasina". British Herpetological Society Bulletin 66: 31-34.
Boulenger, G.A. (1916): "Description of a new genus of the family Lacertidae from Central Africa". The Annals and Magazine of Natural History (8) 18: 112-114.
Cope, E.D. (1862): "On Lacerta echinata and Tiliqua dura". Proceedings of the Academy of Natural Sciences of Philadelphia 1862: 189-191.
Ferwerda, W.H. (1997): "Gastropholis prasina, een boombewonende hagedis uit Kenia". Lacerta 55 (6): 221-223.
Fischer, J.G. (1886): "Herpetologische Notizen". Abhandlungen des Naturwissenschaftlichen Vereins in Hamburg 9: 1-19, Taf. I – II. Description of the Genus Gastropholis
Greenbaum, E., Villanueva, C.O., Kusamba, C., Aristote, M.M. & Branch, W.R. (2011): "A molecular phylogeny of Equatorial African Lacertidae, with the description of a new genus and species from eastern Democratic Republic of the Congo". Zoological Journal of the Linnean Society 163: 913–942.
Schmidt, K.P. (1919): "Contributions to the herpetology of the Belgian Congo based on the collection of the American Congo Expedition, 1909-1915. Part I. Turtles, crocodiles, lizards, and chameleons". Bulletin of the American Museum of Natural History 39 (2): 385–624.
Spawls, S., Howell, K.M., Drewes, R.C. and Ashe, J. (2002): "A Field Guide to the Reptiles of East Africa". Academic Press, Elsevier Science, San Diego, San Francisco, New York, Boston, London.
Tornier, G. (1900): "Neue Liste der Crocodilen, Schildkröten und Eidechsen Deutsch-Ost-Afrikas". Zoologische Jahrbücher. Abteilung für Systematik, Geographie und Biologie der Tiere, Jena, 13: 579-681. (Gastropholis lutzei n.sp. = G. vittata)
Werner, F. (1904): "Beschreibung neuer Reptilien aus den Gattungen Acanthosaura, Calotes, Gastropholis und Typhlops". Zoologischer Anzeiger 27: 461-464.

 
Lizard genera
Taxa named by Johann Gustav Fischer